A defense line or fortification line is a geographically-recognizable line of troops and armament, fortified and set up to protect a high-value location or defend territory.

A defense line may be based on natural difficult terrain features, such as rivers or marshes, mountain ranges, or coastlines; temporary field fortification works such as trenches; and/or more permanent fortifications such as fortresses and bunkers.

List of defense lines 

Some notable defense lines include:

Historical 
 Great Wall of China, China
 Sassanian defense lines
 Great Wall of Gorgan, Persia
 Derbent Walls
 Defence lines of the Netherlands
 Median Wall (before 401 BC)
 Limes Germanicus, Germany
 Hadrian's Wall, United Kingdom (122)
 Antonine Wall, United Kingdom (142)
 Serpent's Wall, Ukraine
 Western Russian fortresses, Russia
 Civil War Defenses of Washington, United States
 Victoria Lines, Malta (1875)
 Hindenburg Line, France (1916)
 Maginot Line, France (1929)
 Schuster Line, Luxembourg
 Metaxas Line, Greece (1936-1941)
 Mannerheim Line, Finland (1939–1940)
 K-W Line, Belgium (1939)
 Siegfried Line, Germany 
 Gothic Line, Italy
 Winter Line (Gustav, Bernhardt and Hitler Lines), Italy
 Panther–Wotan line, Russia (1943)
 McNamara Line, South Vietnam (1966)
 Bar Lev Line, Sinai Peninsula (1973)

Modern 

 Russia–Ukraine barrier, Ukraine
 Muhamalai FDL, Sri Lanka
 Nagarcoil FDL, Sri Lanka

Notes

References